The LSK489 is a monolithic N-Channel JFET designed and built by Linear Integrated Systems, Inc.LIS Inc, a Fremont, CA company.  The part was introduced in 2013 and was named by EDN Tech as one of the “2013 EDN Hot 100” electronics industry innovations for the year. In a product review published earlier that year, EDN noted:
This JFET is part of a family of ultra-low-noise, dual JFET.

Part characteristics
The LSK489 is an N-channel monolithic dual JFET with 1.8 nV per square root Hz noise at 1kHz and low-capacitance  (Ciss= 4pF).  The part is not graded with respect to IDSS, with the typical value being 5 mA, a low of 2.5 mA and a high of 15 mA.  Characteristics include: 
Tight differential voltage match vs. current; 
Improved op amp speed settling time accuracy; 
Minimum Input Error trimming error voltage;
Lower intermodulation distortion.
The part achieves very low noise with respect to its transconductance, which is attributed to the producer’s ability to eliminate almost all of the generation-recombination noise usually present in JFETs. 
The part is available in TO-71, SOIC-A, and SOT-23 packages, as well as bare die.

Related parts
The LSK489 (N-Channel Monolithic Dual JFET) and LSJ689  (P-Channel Monolithic Dual JEFT), also produced by Linear Integrated Systems, are complementary pairs. These two parts are the only complementary dual JFETs pair currently in production. The LSK489 is close in electrical performance, except for having superior noise characteristics, to the LS843 series and the Siliconix U401-403 series.  It has slightly higher noise than the LSK389 (1.8 nV vs. 0.9 nV) but lower CISS (4pF vs. 20pF).

Applications
The LSK489 is used in a wide range of front-end signal chain applications, including audio preamps, piezoelectric element preamps and photodiode preamps.  The part is also used in high-end sensor systems ranging from hydrophones to the front end of the Large Synoptic Survey Telescope (LSST) being developed by SLAC National Accelerator Laboratory.

References

External links
Company Data Sheet
Company Application Note

Commercial transistors